The Abruzzo regional election of 1990 took place on 6 and 7 May 1990.

Events
Christian Democracy was by far the largest party, while the Italian Communist Party came distantly second.

After the election Christian Democrat Rocco Salini formed a centre-left government. In 1992 Salini, who was elected to the Italian Parliament, was replaced as President by fellow Christian Democrat Vincenzo Del Colle.

Results

Source: Ministry of the Interior

Elections in Abruzzo
1990 elections in Italy
May 1990 events in Europe